Back-On (stylized as BACK-ON) is a Japanese rock band from Tokyo, Japan. They are recognized for creating anime and game opening themes such as the Tales of the World: Radiant Mythology 2 opening theme, "fly away"; Air Gear opening theme, "Chain"; Murder Princess opening theme "Hikari Sasuhou (fk Metal ver.)", and Eyeshield 21s "Blaze Line". They have also written ending themes for both anime and TV shows, including "flower" and "a day dreaming..." for Eyeshield 21, and "Butterfly" for the late-night TV drama Shinjuku Swan, "Sands of Time" for the mobile robot TV drama Keitai Sousakan 7, and "Strike Back" for the anime series Fairy Tail.

History
Kenji03 and Gori have been friends since childhood, having attended the same school in Adachi, Tokyo. In their sixth year in school, they realized that they wanted to start a band, though in the beginning they did it all separately. While in high school, Kenji03 met Teeda while Gori met Shu. They each started out in separate bands, but eventually ended up uniting with each other to form their own band. Shortly after their formulation, Kenji03 met his brother's friend Macchin, who joined the band as its drummer and rounded out the quintet.

Back-On made their first international appearance at Anime Matsuri on April 28, 2007 in Houston, Texas and were invited back for Anime Matsuri 2010. Since then they've also appeared in Vancouver, Canada for Anime Evolution in August 2007, and Anime USA in Arlington, Virginia in November 2007. They were also the guest judges for Anime Idol 2007 at Anime Evolution.

They formed a new band called BAReeeeeeeeeeN with the 4-man band GReeeeN, and their debut single "Ashiato" was released on October 1, 2008. The song reached No. 1 in the USEN and chaku-uta digital download charts.

The band's singles "Flyaway" and "Where Is the Future?" were created as the theme music for the PSP game Tales of the World: Radiant Mythology 2, which was released exclusively in Japan on January 28, 2009.

Back-On performed at Connichi 2009 in Kassel, Germany in 2009, and revisited Taiwan for two live performances in December 2009.

Their single One Step!/Tomorrow Never Knows was released on January 27, 2010; "Tomorrow never knows" was used as the background theme music for the DyDo coffee commercial featuring Teppei Tajima, the Japanese surfer.

In 2013/14, the band composed and performed two opening themes for the anime series Gundam Build Fighters, called  and "wimp ft. Lil' Fang (from FAKY)"; the latter features vocals by Lil' Fang from the group FAKY and aired from episode 14 onwards. Both singles were released in three versions: CD-only, CD+DVD (with videos) and CD+gunpla plastic model.

They were invited back to perform at Anime USA in 2013 after a 6-year break from the US and were also star guests at Pacific Media Expo shortly after.

The band performed at Anime Friends in 2014 as their first visit to Brazil.

Back-On also performed as a headliner at Otakon Matsuri in 2015.

On May 26, 2017, the band celebrated its 15th anniversary with a concert at Ebisu Liquidroom titled "BACK-ON 15th Anniversary Live -Ultimate Thanks-". Gori and Shu quit the band after this show, leaving Back-On as the duo of Kenji03 and Teeda.

Members

Current
 Kenji03 (aka Hi-yunk) - Vocals, MC, guitar (2002–present)
 Teeda - MC (2002–present)

Former
 Gori - Bass guitar (2002–2017)
 Shu - Guitar (2002–2017)
 Macchin - Drums (2002–2006)
 Icchan - Drums (2006–2011)

Discography

Singles

Mini-albums

Full albums

Songs used in media
Air Gear Opening Theme: "Chain"
Murder Princess Opening Theme: 
Eyeshield 21 4th Opening Theme: "Blaze Line"
Eyeshield 21 5th Closing Theme: "A Day Dreaming..."
Eyeshield 21 6th Closing Theme: "Flower"
Tokyo Mayokara 1st Theme: 
Tokyo Mayokara 2nd Theme: "Colors"
Shinjuku Swan Ending Theme: "Butterfly"
K-tai Investigator 7 Ending Theme: "Sands of Time"
Tales of the World: Radiant Mythology 2 Opening Theme: "Flyaway"
Tales of the World: Radiant Mythology 2 Ending Theme: "Where Is the Future?"
IAMS Japan's 2009 animal shelter series Theme: "We Are..."
DyDo coffee TV CM Theme: "Tomorrow Never Knows"
Tales of the World: Radiant Mythology 3 Opening Theme: "With You feat. Me (Misono Koda)"
Tales of the World: Radiant Mythology 3 Ending Theme:
Gundam Breaker Opening Theme: "Infinity"
Gundam Build Fighters Opening Theme: "ニブンノイチ -One Half-"
Gundam Build Fighters Opening Theme: "wimp ft. Lil' Fang (from FAKY)"
Fairy Tail 16th Opening Theme: "Strike Back"
Gundam Build Fighters Try Opening Theme: "Cerulean"
Gundam Build Fighters Try: Island Wars Opening Theme: "The Last One"
Gundam Breaker 2 Opening Theme: "Silent Trigger"
Initial D Legend 2: Racer Closing Theme: "Resurrection"
Gundam Breaker 3 Opening Theme: "Mirrors"
Gundam Build Fighters: GM's Counterattack Opening Theme: "Carry on"

Videography

PV
 Flydom (Hero)
 Nuts Tribe (Hero)
 Gaku-Ten (Baby Rock)
  (Chain)
 Chain (Chain)
 New World (New World)
 A Day Dreaming... (Blaze Line/A Day Dreaming...)
 Blaze Line (Blaze Line/A Day Dreaming...)
 Flower (Flower)
 Butterfly (Butterfly)
 Sands of Time (YES!!!)
 Flyaway (YES!!!)
 One Step! (Hello World)
 Tell Me (Hello World)
 With You (Hello World)
 Ice cream (Good Job!!)
 ニブンノイチ (ニブンノイチ / INFINITY)
 wimp ft. Lil' Fang (from FAKY) (wimp ft. Lil' Fang (from FAKY))

References

External links 
 

Japanese rock music groups
Japanese alternative rock groups
Rap rock groups
Musical groups from Tokyo